Albert Charles Peale (1 April 1849 – 5 December 1914) was an American geologist, mineralogist and paleobotanist.

Biography 
Born in Heckscherville, Pennsylvania, Albert C. Peale was the son of Charles Willson Peale (1821-1871) and Harriet Friel. Albert Peale's paternal grandfather was Rubens Peale and his paternal great-grandfather was the painter Charles Willson Peale. 
Albert Peale graduated from the Central High School, Philadelphia with A.B. in 1868 and A.M in 1873. He studied during 1870 at the auxiliary medical department of the University of Pennsylvania and graduated there with M.D. in 1871. Although he had a medical degree, he never practiced medicine.

From 1871 to 1879, Peale served as a mineralogist and geologist for the United States Geological and Geographic Survey of the Territories. As such, he traveled on several of the Ferdinand Hayden expeditions that explored and mapped the western United States. In 1875, he married Emilie Wiswell, the daughter of the Rev. George F. Wiswell (1820-1892), a Philadelphia minister and former president of Delaware College (today the University of Delaware).

From 1882 to 1898 he was a geologist with the United States Geological Survey. From 1898 to his death in 1914 in Philadelphia, Peale was a paleobotanist for the United States National Museum. He was the author of numerous geographic and geological papers, reports, and monographs. From 1884 to 1897 he was Secretary of the Chemical Society of Washington.

Peale's name has been attached to several geological features located in widely separated localities, including Peale Island,Peale Island Map - Wyoming - Mapcarta the most southerly island in Yellowstone Lake; Mount Peale, the highest peak in the La Sal Mountains in eastern Utah, near the Colorado border; and the Peale Mountains in eastern Caribou County, Idaho.

Selected publications

See also
Hayden Geological Survey of 1871

References

External links

1849 births
1914 deaths
American geologists
Explorers of the United States
Paleobotanists
Albert Charles
People from Schuylkill County, Pennsylvania
United States Geological Survey personnel